KCVX (91.7 FM) is a radio station licensed to Salem, Missouri, United States.  The station is an affiliate of Spirit FM, broadcasting a Christian Contemporary Music format with a few Christian talk and teaching programs, and is currently owned by Lake Area Educational Broadcasting Foundation.

History
The station was assigned the call letters KYMR on March 2, 2001.  On September 24, 2003, the station changed its call sign to the current KCVX.

References

External links
 

CVX